The Philippine Super Liga (PSL) draft was an annual event in the league's calendar during the 2014, 2015 and 2016 seasons in which teams can acquire new players outside the league which are not free agents in an agreed-upon order. The first two drafting procedures (2014 and 2015) were held at the SM Aura, in Bonifacio Global City, Taguig City.

2014 First Round Draft Picks

2015 First Round Draft Picks

2016 First Round draft picks

References

Philippine Super Liga